The Betfred British Masters is a professional golf tournament. It was founded in 1946 as the Dunlop Masters and was held every year up to 2008, except for 1984. Dunlop's sponsorship ended in 1982, and the name sponsor changed frequently thereafter, with the words "British Masters" usually also in the tournament's official name. The tournament was not held from 2009 to 2014 but returned to the schedule in 2015.

History
The Dunlop Masters was first held in 1946 at Stoneham Golf Club in Southampton, and was a continuation of the Dunlop-Metropolitan Tournament which had been held before World War II. Like the Dunlop-Metropolitan, the Dunlop Masters was a 72-hole end-of-season event with a restricted field. The Dunlop-Metropolitan had been first played in 1934, the same year as The Masters. The event was sponsored by Dunlop from 1946 to 1982, during which time it continued to have a small field with no 36-hole cut. There were 50 competitors in the final Dunlop-sponsored event in 1982.

During the 1980s the British Masters was one of the most lucrative events on the European Tour with a prize fund that was as high as third among the tournaments on the schedule, but its status, or at least its relative level of prize money, has declined considerably in recent years.

The tournament has been played at many different venues; twice in the "Dunlop Masters" era it was held in the Republic of Ireland. When the Quinn Group took over as sponsors in 2006, the event was moved again, this time to the Group owned Belfry.

The deal with the Quinn Group ended in 2008, and when attempts to find another sponsor were unsuccessful, the British Masters was removed from the European Tour schedule for 2009.

Tournament hosts
The event returned in 2015 with a leading British golfer choosing the golf course and hosting the event. Since then the editions have been hosted by:
2015: Ian Poulter at Woburn Golf Club
2016: Luke Donald at The Grove 
2017: Lee Westwood at Close House Golf Club
2018: Justin Rose at Walton Heath Golf Club
2019: Tommy Fleetwood at Hillside Golf Club
2020: Lee Westwood at Close House Golf Club
2021: Danny Willett at The Belfry
2022: Danny Willett at The Belfry
2023–2026: Nick Faldo at The Belfry

Notable events
The 1967 event was notable for providing British television with its first live hole in one, as Tony Jacklin aced the 16th hole at Royal St George's.

The 2021 event was also notable, as Richard Bland at age 48, claimed his first European Tour victory in his 478th start on the tour.

Winners

Multiple winners
2 wins: Seve Ballesteros, Harry Bradshaw, Bernard Gallacher, Bernard Hunt, Tony Jacklin, Cobie Legrange, Bobby Locke, Greg Norman, Christy O'Connor Snr, Dai Rees, Peter Thomson, Harry Weetman, Ian Woosnam

References

External links
Coverage on the European Tour's official website

European Tour events
Golf tournaments in England
Recurring sporting events established in 1946
1946 establishments in England